Daniel Alexandre Calado Casaleiro (born 2 November 1989 in Entroncamento, Santarém District) is a Portuguese footballer who plays as a goalkeeper for G.D.P. Costa de Caparica.

External links

1989 births
Living people
People from Entroncamento
Portuguese footballers
Association football goalkeepers
Liga Portugal 2 players
Segunda Divisão players
G.D. Chaves players
Portugal youth international footballers
Sportspeople from Santarém District